James Michael Burke (1873 – 10 September 1936) was an Irish Cumann na nGaedheal politician, newspaper editor and barrister. He was born and lived in Skibbereen, County Cork. He was first appointed editor of the Southern Star newspaper in 1915 and held that post from 1921 to 1933. 

As a public representative he served on the Skibbereen Urban Council, Cork County Council and he was elected to Dáil Éireann as a Cumann na nGaedhael Teachta Dála (TD) for the Cork West constituency at the 1933 general election. He died in office in 1936, but no by-election was held for his seat.

Burke was also a noted historian, writing numerous historical articles in the Southern Star newspaper and for journals such as the Journal of the Cork Historical and Archaeological Society.

References

1873 births
1936 deaths
Cumann na nGaedheal TDs
Fine Gael TDs
Members of the 8th Dáil
Politicians from County Cork
Irish barristers